Robert "Bob" Arthur Peach (born 15 July 1937) is an English former first-class cricketer.

While serving in the Royal Artillery, Peach played first-class cricket for the Combined Services cricket team in 1960, making two appearances against Cambridge University at Fenner's, and Surrey at The Oval. He scored 6 runs and took no wickets with his right-arm medium-fast bowling. Peach played his club cricket for South Hampstead, where captained the First XI between 1961–68 and later served on the club committee. In 2010, he was the representative for the London Federation for Sport and Recreation to the Middlesex Cricket Board.

References

External links

1937 births
Living people
People from Marylebone
Royal Artillery personnel
English cricketers
Combined Services cricketers
Military personnel from London
20th-century British Army personnel